Roberto Antonio Molina  (born 28 October 1971 in Mendoza) is a former Argentine footballer.

Club career
Molina played for Ferro Carril Oeste, Rosario Central, Independiente and Racing in the Primera División Argentina. Molina played several seasons in the Primera División de México, with América, Atlante, Toros Neza and Puebla. He also had a brief spell with Barcelona in Ecuador.

Molina also earned one cap for Argentina, coming on as a substitute in a World Cup qualifying match against Venezuela on October 9, 1996. He also played for Argentina at the 1991 FIFA World Youth Championship finals in Portugal.

References

External links
 

1971 births
Living people
Argentine footballers
Argentina youth international footballers
Argentina under-20 international footballers
Argentina international footballers
Ferro Carril Oeste footballers
Rosario Central footballers
Club Atlético Independiente footballers
Racing Club de Avellaneda footballers
Club América footballers
Atlante F.C. footballers
Club Puebla players
Barcelona S.C. footballers
Argentine Primera División players
Liga MX players
Argentine expatriate footballers
Expatriate footballers in Mexico
Expatriate footballers in Ecuador
Sportspeople from Mendoza, Argentina
Toros Neza footballers
Association football midfielders